Geophilus punicus is a species of soil centipede in the family Geophilidae found in the Western Mediterranean, specifically Italy (Sicily, Sardinia) and North Africa (Tunisia). It's an epigeic species, though its habitat preferences are unknown apart from one record from caves, indicating it may also be a trogloxene. The original description of this species is based on male specimens with 43 pairs of legs.

Taxonomy
Geophilus punicus was originally described as a subspecies of G. flavus, G. flavus var. punicus, by Silvestri (1896a). It was later raised to species rank by Minelli in the World Catalogue of Centipedes (2006). The name "Geophilus flavidus Koch" published by Verhoeff in 1925 was probably due to a misreading of G. flavus punicus. G. punicus is considered a junior synonym of G. longicornis var. austriacus Latzel, 1880 by Attems (1929 - Das Tierreich, 52: 174), but they actually differ according to the original description.

References 

punicus
Myriapods of Europe
Arthropods of Africa
Animals described in 1896
Taxa named by Filippo Silvestri